Raja Mohammad is an Indian film editor, who works in the Malayalam and Tamil film industries. He won the National Film Award for Best Editing for his work in Paruthiveeran (2007).

Career
Raja Mohammed primarily edited Malayalam films during his early career and his first Tamil venture was through Kamal Haasan's production, Nala Damayanthi (2003). He won the National Film Award for Best Editing for his work in Paruthiveeran (2007); the honour fetched him further opportunities to work in the Tamil film industry. He also won the Vijay Award for Best Editor for his work in M. Sasikumar's directorial debut, the period film, Subramaniapuram (2008).

Filmography

Tamil

 Nala Damayanthi (2003)
 Udhaya (2004)
 Raam (2005)
 Paruthiveeran (2007)
 Subramaniapuram (2008)
 Thenavattu (2008)
 Aval Peyar Thamizharasi (2010)
 Irumbukkottai Murattu Singam (2010)
 Kalavani (2010)
 Virunthali (2010)
 Mandhira Punnagai (2010)
 Markandeyan (2011)
 Potta Potti (2011)
 Mounaguru (2011)
 Bramman (2014)
 Eetti (2015)
 Wagah (2016)
 Thiruttu Payale 2 (2017)
 Thorati (2019)
 Michaelpatty Raja (2021)
 Kasada Thapara (2021)
 Sinam (2022)

Malayalam

 Nakshathrakkannulla Rajakumaran Avanundoru Rajakumari (2002)
 Swapnam Kondu Thulabharam (2003)
 Chakram (2003)
 Kaazhcha (2004)
 Immini Nalloraal (2005)
 Thanmathra (2005)
 Madhuchandralekha (2006)
 Chakkara Muthu (2006)
 Palunku (2006)
 Romeoo (2007)
 My Big Father (2009)
 Chemistry (2009)
 April Fool (2010)
 Pranayam (2011)
 Mamangam (2019)

References

External links
 

Living people
Artists from Chennai
Malayalam film editors
Tamil film editors
Best Editor National Film Award winners
Tamil Nadu State Film Awards winners
Film editors from Tamil Nadu
Year of birth missing (living people)